Leah Brown Allen (November 6, 1884 in Providence, Rhode Island – February 1973) was an American astronomer and Professor of Astronomy at Hood College.

She joined Lick Observatory as Carnegie Assistant in 1908. Professor Allen began teaching astronomy at Hood in 1928.

Education
She studied at Hope Street School, 1902.
Then at Brown University, 1904–1906, special work in astronomy under Professor Winslow Upton.
She received her M.A. from Wellesley College in 1912.

Prizes named in her honor
 Leah B. Allen Award for Excellence in Math and Science, Hood College
 Leah B. Allen Prize in Astronomy, Hood College

Correspondents
 Annie Jump Cannon
 William F. Meggers

Memberships
 American Astronomical Society
 AAVSO, Charter Member

Publications
 "A study of the peculiar spectrum of the star Eta Centauri"  (Master's thesis, 1912)  is held in the Wellesley College Archives .
 The radial velocities of twenty southern variable stars of class Me ; A study of the changes in the spectrum of T Centauri (Lick Observatory bulletin) University of California Press (1925) WorldCat

References 
    

1884 births
1973 deaths
American women astronomers
20th-century American women scientists
Wellesley College alumni
Brown University alumni
Hood College faculty
Whitin Observatory
20th-century American astronomers
American women academics